Comesperma calymega, commonly known as blue-spike milkwort,   is a slender herb in the family Polygalaceae. It is a perennial herb growing to between 10 cm and 50 cm high, from a short woody rhizome.

The species was first formally described by French botanist Jacques Labillardière in Novae Hollandiae Plantarum Specimen in 1806, from a specimen collected in Tasmania.

The species occurs in the states of  South Australia, Tasmania, Victoria, and Western Australia.

References

calymega
Flora of South Australia
Flora of Victoria (Australia)
Flora of Tasmania
Flora of Western Australia
Plants described in 1806